Zouch is a surname. Notable people with the surname include:

 Edward Zouch (died 1634), English courtier and masque actor
 Henry Zouch (c. 1725–1795), English antiquary and social reformer
 Henry Zouch (Australian) (1811–1883), Canadian-born Australian police officer and racehorse breeder and owner
 Richard Zouch (c. 1590–1661), English judge and Member of Parliament, cousin of 
 Thomas Zouch (1737–1815), English clergyman and antiquary, brother of Henry Zouch

See also
 Roger la Zouch (1292–?), English instigator of the assassination of the Baron of the Exchequer, Roger de Beler
 Baron Zouche